This is a list of census-designated places in New Jersey. As of the 2010 United States Census, the U.S. state of New Jersey had 221 CDPs. Where the CDP is split between townships, the portion of the CDP's total population within each township is listed separately.

While the vast majority of CDPs are located entirely within a single municipality, there are eight CDPs that are split between different townships:
Crandon Lakes - Hampton (682) and Stillwater (496)
Fort Dix - New Hanover (5,951), Pemberton (1,765) and Springfield (0)
Kingston - South Brunswick (1,222) and Franklin (271). 
Lake Mohawk - Byram (1,824) and Sparta (8,092)
McGuire AFB - New Hanover (737) and North Hanover (2,973)
Ocean Acres - Barnegat (925) and Stafford (15,217)
Richwood - Harrison (3,400) and Mantua (59)
Upper Greenwood Lake - West Milford Township and Vernon Township 

Three CDPs share the same name but are located in different counties:
Silver Lake (Essex County), Silver Lake (Warren County) and Silver Lake (Cumberland County) 

Three CDPs are split between two counties:
Kingston - Middlesex County and Somerset County. 
Montclair State University - Passaic County and Essex County
Upper Greenwood Lake - Passaic County and Sussex County

Former census-designated places 
As part of the 2010 Census, the U.S. Census Bureau eliminated many CDPs that were coterminous with their parent townships. The following table lists CDPs that were split, otherwise substantially modified or eliminated.

See also 
 List of counties in New Jersey
 List of municipalities in New Jersey
 Local government in New Jersey

References 

Censusdesignated
New Jersey